WEJT 105.1 FM is a radio station broadcasting a variety hits format, branded as Jack FM. Licensed to Shelbyville, Illinois, the station serves the Decatur, Illinois area, as well as the areas of Taylorville, Illinois and Mattoon, Illinois, and is owned by The Cromwell Group, Inc. of Illinois.

References

External links
WEJT's official website

EJT